The International Metalworkers' Federation (IMF) was a global union federation of metalworkers' trade unions, founded in Zürich, Switzerland in August 1893.  the IMF had more than 200 member organisations in 100 countries, representing a combined membership of 25 million workers.

History 
The federation was founded as the International Metallurgists' Bureau of Information.  In 1904, the International Secretariat of Foundry Workers merged into the federation, which renamed itself as the "International Metalworkers' Federation".  From 1921, its constitution called for not only international co-operation to improve wages and conditions, but also for workers to take over the means of production.

Membership of the federation reached 1.9 million in 1930, but fell to only 190,000 in 1938, hit by the international depression.  By 1947, membership had reached a new high of 2.7 million, and the federation took a leading role in opposing the World Federation of Trade Unions, instead becoming a founding constituent of the International Confederation of Free Trade Unions.

The organization held a congress every four years, consisting of delegates from the member organisations. The congress established the broad lines of the IMF's policies and actions and elected the President and General Secretary of the IMF.  Some member unions wished for the federation to hold sectoral conferences, and the IMF's refusal to do so led six unions to found the International Federation of Foundry Workers in 1949, but this was dissolved in 1954.

The international headquarters of IMF was based in Geneva, Switzerland. There were regional offices in Johannesburg, New Delhi, Kuala Lumpur, Santiago, Mexico City, and a project office in Russia.

In June 2012, the IMF merged into the new global federation IndustriALL Global Union.

Affiliates 
The following unions were affiliated in 2009:

Notes

Leadership

General Secretaries 
1893: Hermann Vogelsanger
1896: Charles Hobson
1904: Alexander Schlicke
1920: Konrad Ilg
1954: Adolphe Graedel
1971: Ivar Noren
1974: Herman Rebhan
1989: Marcello Malentacchi
2009: Jyrki Raina

Presidents 
1960: Otto Brenner
1972: Hans Rasmussen
1974: Eugen Loderer
1984: Hans Mayr
1987: Franz Steinkühler
1993: Klaus Zwickel
2003: Jürgen Peters
2009: Berthold Huber

References

External links 

 
 Catalogue of the IMF British Section archives, held at the Modern Records Centre, University of Warwick

 
Global union federations
Metal trade unions
Trade unions established in 1893
Trade unions disestablished in 2012